Two ships of the United States Navy have been named Allen, for William Henry Allen.

 , a row galley built in 1814.
 , a  launched in 1916 and scrapped in 1948.

Sources

United States Navy ship names